Sanmanassullavarkku Samadhanam is a 1986 Indian Malayalam-language comedy-drama film directed by Sathyan Anthikkad and written by Sreenivasan from a story by Anthikkad. The film stars Mohanlal, Karthika, Sreenivasan and M. G. Soman. The film features songs composed by Jerry Amaldev and background score by Shyam.

The film was a commercial success at the box office. It was remade by I. V. Sasi in Tamil as Illam (1988), in Telugu as Donga Kollu (1988), in Hindi by Priyadarshan as Yeh Teraa Ghar Yeh Meraa Ghar (2001) and twice in Kannada in 2003 as Yardo Duddu Yellammana Jatre and Ananda Nilaya.

Plot

The story revolves around a house owner, Gopalakrishna Panikkar, who is struggling with debt incurred during the wedding of his two sisters. He needs to force his tenants to vacate so that the house can be sold and the debt repaid. The tenants do not want to leave for reasons of their own. How the various situations unfold and what happens to Gopalakrishna Panikker and the tenants is what the movie is all about.

The only way Gopalakrishnan can escape from certain bankruptcy is to sell the property he owns in the city and use the proceeds to settle his debts. To do that, he has to evict his tenants from there first. Unfortunately for him, his tenant is the feisty Meera and her family, who absolutely refuses to vacate the house. Gopalakrishnan uses an obscure clause in the contract to take up residence at the house, and tries his best to smoke his tenants out and takes help of his friend, Sub-Inspector Rajendran (Sreenivasan) to evict them. But Rajendran falls in love with Meera and refuses to evict her.

Gopalakrishnan plans on Rajendran to marry Meera in order to evict her with her family, but fails when it is revealed by Meera's mother that she was a mental patient due to the death of her father. Much hilarity ensues later and Meera at last, on knowing about the extent of Gopalakrishnan's problems, vacates the house without reservations and leaves. But Gopalakrishnan calls her back and decides that this will be their house.

Cast

Mohanlal as Gopalakrishna Panikkar
Karthika as Meera
Sreenivasan as Sub-Inspector K. Rajendran
K. P. A. C. Lalitha as Karthyayani
Mammukoya as Ummer
Thilakan as Damodaran / Damodar Ji
Innocent as Kunji Kannan Nair
Sankaradi as Adv. P. Sreedharan Nair
Sukumari as Panikkar's mother
Thodupuzha Vasanthi as Ayisha
Yadu Krishnan as Monukuttan
Sumitha Rahim as Meera's sister
M. G. Soman as Rajendran's uncle / Poomkinavu Ammavan

Production
The film was shot in and around a house named "Chakyathu" situated near Mahatma Gandhi Road in Kochi, Kerala. Most of the story revolves around the house. The filming in the house was completed in 27 days. After the success of Sanmanassullavarkku Samadhanam, the house has become a location for many films.

Soundtrack
The music was composed by Jerry Amaldev and the lyrics were written by Mullanezhi. Shyam composed the film score.

Reception and remakes
The film was a critical and commercial success. It was later remade in Telugu as Donga Kollu with Rajendra Prasad and Sumalatha, in Tamil as Illam with Sivakumar and Amala, in Kannada as Yardo Duddu Yellammana Jatre (2003) with Jaggesh and once again in Kannada as Ananda Nilaya and in Hindi as Yeh Teraa Ghar Yeh Meraa Ghar directed by Priyadarshan and starring Sunil Shetty in the lead role.

References

External links
 
 Sanmanassullavarkku Samadhanam at Malayalachalachithram
 Sanmanassullavarkku Samadhanam at Malayalasangeetham

1986 films
Films scored by Jerry Amaldev
1980s Malayalam-language films
1980s romantic comedy-drama films
Indian comedy-drama films
Films shot in Kochi
Films with screenplays by Sreenivasan
Films directed by Sathyan Anthikad
Malayalam films remade in other languages
1986 comedy-drama films